Asiegu is a hamlet (aldea) in the parish of Carreña, in the Asturian municipality (conceyu) of Cabrales.

It is located 3 km from Carreña, the capital of the municipality, and 425 m of altitude. In 2018 it had a population of 95 inhabitants.

On September 2, 2019, the jury of the Princess of Asturias Awards granted Asiegu the Exemplary People of Asturias Award.

References 

Populated places in Asturias